Corbett is a hamlet in Delaware County, New York. It is located southeast of Downsville on the shore of the East Branch Delaware River. Campbell Brook flows west through the hamlet.

References

Geography of Delaware County, New York
Hamlets in Delaware County, New York
Hamlets in New York (state)